The cabinet of Lothar de Maizière was the last cabinet of East Germany before German reunification. It was formed on 12 April 1990, following the general election in March, and existed until reunification with West Germany on 3 October 1990.

It was originally a coalition government between the Alliance for Germany (Christian Democratic Union (CDU), German Social Union (DSU), Democratic Awakening (DA)), Social Democratic Party in the GDR (SPD), and Association of Free Democrats (BFD). On 16 August, three ministers were fired from the cabinet. In protest, the SPD left the coalition and their remaining ministers resigned on 20 August.

Composition 

 Government spokesperson:  (CDU)
 Deputy government spokesperson: Angela Merkel (DA)

References 

Historic German cabinets
Cabinets established in 1990
Cabinets disestablished in 1990
Government of East Germany